Frederick Charles Long (27 May 1896 – 9 October 1977) was an Australian rules footballer who played with Melbourne in the Victorian Football League (VFL).

Notes

External links 

 

1896 births
1977 deaths
Australian rules footballers from Victoria (Australia)
Melbourne Football Club players